The 2006 Shakey's V-League (SVL) season was the 3rd season of the Shakey's V-League.

1st conference 
The Shakey's V-League 3rd Season 1st Conference was the 4th conference of the Shakey's V-League. The tournament started April 22, 2006.

Participating teams

Final standings

Individual awards

Venues 
 Blue Eagle Gym, Quezon City

References 

2006 in Philippine sport